"Honor" is a song by VNV Nation from the band's 1998 album, Praise the Fallen.

In the 2003, they re-recorded the song and released it as a single under the title "Honour 2003". It was their first single released on their own Anachron imprint, after they left Dependent. The single charted in the German mainstream Media Control charts for one week at no. 98 and peaked at #1 on the German Alternative Charts (DAC) with a ranking of #8 on the DAC 2003 Top Singles chart.

Track listing 
Honour 2003	 [8:07]	
Fearless (Live)	 [6:33]	
Legion (Live)	 [4:45]	
Secondskin (Spoken)	 [6:37]

References

1998 songs
2003 singles
VNV Nation songs
Futurepop songs